Abdulla Haneef (born 2 October 1984) is a Maldivian professional footballer who plays for TC Sports Club.

Career
He started playing at Hurriyya, before playing for VB Addu FC, Club Eagles, Club Valencia and New Radiant. He joined TC Sports Club in 2017.

International
Haneef made his debut against Philippines on 16 April 2009, in the 2010 AFC Challenge Cup qualification. He came in as an 83rd-minute substitute for Mukhthar Naseer.

References

External links
 
 

1984 births
Living people
Maldivian footballers
Association football defenders
Association football midfielders
Maldives international footballers
Footballers at the 2006 Asian Games
Asian Games competitors for the Maldives
T.C. Sports Club players
Club Eagles players